Arquata Scrivia railway station serves the town and comune of Arquata Scrivia, in the Piedmont region, northwestern Italy.

Railway stations in Piedmont
Railway stations opened in 1889